SS Benjamin H. Hill was a Liberty ship built in the United States during World War II. She was named after Benjamin H. Hill, a Confederate senator and later a US Representative, US senator from the state of Georgia.

Construction
Benjamin H. Hill was laid down on 16 December 1943, under a Maritime Commission (MARCOM) contract, MC hull 1514, by J.A. Jones Construction, Brunswick, Georgia; she was sponsored by Mrs. John D. Pellett, and launched on 7 February 1944.

History
She was allocated to the A. L. Burbank & Company, on 19 February 1944. On 8 October 1947, she was laid up in the National Defense Reserve Fleet in the James River Group, Lee Hall, Virginia. On 20 May 1954, she was withdrawn from the fleet to be loaded with grain under the "Grain Program 1954", she returned loaded with grain on 28 May 1954. She was again withdrawn from the fleet on 4 April 1959, to have the grain unloaded, she returned empty on 11 April 1959. On 18 November 1960, she was withdrawn from the fleet to be loaded with grain under the "Grain Program 1960", she returned loaded with grain on 7 December 1960. She was again withdrawn from the fleet on 19 May 1963, to have the grain unloaded, she returned empty on 22 May 1963. On 2 February 1971, she was sold, along with the ship Monterey, to Hierros Andes, S.A., for $172,500, for scrapping, she was delivered on 9 September 1971.

References

Bibliography

 
 
 
 
 

 

Liberty ships
Ships built in Brunswick, Georgia
1944 ships
James River Reserve Fleet
James River Reserve Fleet Grain Program